Revolutionary Socialist Labor Party, a radical split from the Socialist Labor Party in the United States. RSLP was formed in 1881 by anarchist-oriented elements of the SLP that had rallied around 'Revolutionary Clubs'. 

In 1883 it merged with other anarchist groups to form the International Working People's Association.
1883 disestablishments in the United States
1881 establishments in the United States
Defunct anarchist organizations in North America
Defunct socialist parties in the United States
Labor parties in the United States
Political parties disestablished in 1883
Political parties established in 1881
Socialist Labor Party of America